The 1921–22 Western Football League season was the 25th in the history of the Western Football League.

The Division One champions this season were Yeovil and Petters United, for the first time in their history. Champions of Division Two were Clandown, who left the league at the end of the season, as the previous season's trend of many clubs leaving the Western League continued.

Division One
Five new clubs joined Division One this season, although the number of clubs was reduced from sixteen to eight after Abertillery Town, Barry Reserves, Bath City, Bristol City Reserves, Bristol Rovers Reserves, Cardiff City Reserves, Douglas, Exeter City Reserves, Mid Rhondda, Pontypridd, Swansea Town Reserves, Swindon Town Reserves and Ton Pentre left the league.

Horfield United, rejoining after leaving the league in 1920
Peasedown St John, promoted from Division Two
Torquay United, joining from the Plymouth & District League
Trowbridge Town, promoted from Division Two
Weymouth, rejoining after leaving the league in 1914

Division Two
One new club joined Division Two this season, although the number of clubs was reduced from ten to nine after Peasedown St John and Trowbridge Town were promoted.

Coleford Athletic

References

1921-22
1921–22 in Welsh football
1921–22 in English football leagues